Correo de Guatemala S.A. is the national post office of Guatemala.

References

External links 
Archived website
Official website

Communications in Guatemala
Philately of Guatemala
Postal organizations